Ibrahima Koné (born 26 July 1969) is a former Ivorian footballer who played as a midfielder for various clubs and the Ivory Coast national football team.

External links
 

1969 births
Living people
Footballers from Abidjan
Association football midfielders
Ivorian footballers
Ivorian expatriate footballers
Ivory Coast international footballers
1992 King Fahd Cup players
1996 African Cup of Nations players
1998 African Cup of Nations players
2000 African Cup of Nations players
2002 African Cup of Nations players
Expatriate footballers in Ghana
Ivorian expatriate sportspeople in Ghana
Expatriate footballers in Tunisia
Ivorian expatriate sportspeople in Tunisia
Expatriate footballers in Qatar
Ivorian expatriate sportspeople in Qatar
Africa Sports d'Abidjan players
Étoile Sportive du Sahel players
Ashanti Gold SC players
Al Ahli SC (Doha) players